Didehban (also Romanized as Dīdehbān; also known as Dīdebān) is a village in Emad Deh Rural District, Sahray-ye Bagh District, Larestan County, Fars Province, Iran. At the 2006 census, its population was 1,620, in 352 families.

References 

Populated places in Larestan County